Murus Dacicus (Latin for Dacian Wall) is a construction method for defensive walls and fortifications developed in ancient Dacia sometime before the Roman conquest. It is a mix between traditional construction methods particular to Dacian builders and methods imported from Greek and Roman architecture and masonry, and – although somewhat similar construction techniques were used before, during and long after the period – it has peculiarities that make it unique.

Design
Murus Dacicus consisted of two outer walls made out of stone blocks carved in the shape of a rectangular parallelepiped; apparently no mortar was used, thus making them examples of ashlar masonry – but typically done with regular sized, bigger-than-average blocks, due to technological requirements. After each layer of the outer walls was completed, the gap between them would be filled with gravel and rocks cemented together with clay and compacted (cf. also rammed earth technique). The structure was strengthened and consolidated at the level of each layer by horizontal, singed/scorched wood tie beams connected to the outer walls by means of a dovetail joint at the upper surface of the stone block (hence the need for big stone blocks of the same size). Due to its higher flexibility, this structure had a distinct advantage over the 'classical', solid dry stone wall (as seen, e. g., in the cyclopean and ashlar walls in Mycenae): a higher capability of shock absorption and dissipation of kinetic energy from an incoming projectile thrown by a siege weapon. However, archaeological and historical evidence suggests that the wall might have been topped by a wooden palisade instead of stone battlements, which had the obvious disadvantage of being vulnerable to fire.

A properly built Dacian Wall would be both labor-intensive and time-consuming. A typical wall for the late period, hastily built in the years between the two Dacian Wars (when Dacia had to rebuild, repair, enlarge or reinforce the defenses of many of its key fortresses), would be about 3–4 meters thick and 10 m tall, an outstanding achievement in the given conditions.

The Dacian Fortresses of the Orăştie Mountains, UNESCO World Heritage Sites are examples of citadels built using this method. Also the Dacian walls are depicted on the Trajan's column in Rome.

See also 
 Davae
 Hill fort
 Murus gallicus
 Oppidum
 Pfostenschlitzmauer

References

Further reading 

 Murus Dacicus in 3D at RomaniaDeVis.ro, 3D reconstruction (v.1)
 A page with examples of Neolithic to Dacian houses, and at the end, an example of the Dacian wall
 Dacian wall (murus dacicus), 3D reconstruction (v.2), stone ramparts
 Dacian wall (murus dacicus), 3D reconstruction (v.3), wooden ramparts

External links 

Military history of Dacia
Dacian towns
Fortification lines
Iron Age Europe
Dacian fortresses